Subtle as a Flying Mallet is the second solo album by Dave Edmunds, principally focused on sound-alike remakes of late 1950s and early 1960s hits. All of the vocals (except on the live tracks) are by Edmunds, and many of the songs are true solo efforts in that Edmunds also plays all the instruments.   The album produced two Top 10 singles in the UK, remakes of the Phil Spector hit "Baby, I Love You" and The Chordettes' "Born to Be with You". A 2006 reissue of the album includes two former B-sides as bonus tracks.

The album was also rereleased in February 2013 by Rpm Records UK as a deluxe edition.

Track listing

Subtle as a Flying Mallet
 "Baby, I Love You" (Phil Spector, Ellie Greenwich, Jeff Barry) - 3:33
 "Leave My Woman Alone" (Ray Charles) - 2:39
 "Maybe" (Richard Barrett) - 2:55
 "Da Doo Ron Ron" (Spector, Greenwich, Barry) - 2:22
 "Let It Be Me" (Gilbert Bécaud, Mann Curtis, Pierre Delanoë) - 2:47
 "No Money Down" (live) (Chuck Berry) - 3:52
 "A Shot of Rhythm and Blues" (Terry Thompson) - 2:44
 "Billy the Kid" (arranged by Dave Edmunds) - 3:36
 "Born to Be with You" (Don Robertson) - 3:33
 "She's My Baby" (Nick Lowe) - 3:38
 "I Ain't Never" (Mel Tillis, Webb Pierce) - 3:16
 "Let It Rock" (live) (Berry) - 3:01

Bonus Tracks (2006 reissue)
 "Pick Axe Rag" (Edmunds, Mickey Gee) - 2:56
 "Some Other Guy" (Richard Barrett, Jerry Leiber, Mike Stoller) - 2:25

Subtle as a Flying Mallet February 2013 deluxe edition. Rpm Records UK
 "Baby, I Love You" 
 "Leave My Woman Alone" 
 "Maybe" 
 "Da Doo Ron Ron" 
 "Let It Be Me" 
 "No Money Down" 
 "Shot of Rhythm and Blues" 
 "Billy the Kid" 
 "Born to Be with You" 
 "She's My Baby" 
 "I Ain't Never" 
 "Let It Rock" 
 "Some Other Guy" 
 "When Will I Be Loved" 
 "Make Me Good" 
 "You Kept Me Waiting" 
 "C'mon Little Dixie" 
 "Need a Shot of Rhythm & Blues"  (Alt. VSN)
 "Da Doo Ron Ron"  (Dave Edmunds & the Electricians)
 "Pick Axe Rag"  (Instrumental)

Personnel
 Dave Edmunds - vocals, all guitars, bass, keyboards, drums
 Nick Lowe - bass 
 Pick Withers - drums
 Bob Andrews - piano
 Brinsley Schwarz - backing band on "Let It Rock" and "No Money Down" (live in Cardiff)
 Bob Andrews - piano
 Ian Gomm - guitar, vocals
 Nick Lowe - bass 
 Billy Rankin - drums
 Brinsley Schwarz - guitar
 Album cover design by Hipgnosis
 Logotype and Lettering by Richard Evans

References

Dave Edmunds albums
1975 albums
Albums with cover art by Hipgnosis
RCA Records albums
Albums produced by Dave Edmunds
Albums recorded at Rockfield Studios